Tytti Isohookana-Asunmaa (born 24 September 1947, in Haukipudas) is a Finnish politician. She represents the Centre Party.

Isohookana-Asunmaa holds a master's degree of Philosophy (1971) and a Doctorate of State sciences (1980). She works as assistant professor of Communal sciences in the University of Oulu. In 1983 Isohookana-Asunmaa was elected as a member of the Finnish parliament, from the Centre Party.

Isohookana-Asunmaa is married and has a son.

Sources
 Tytti Isohookana-Asunmaa's home page in the Finnish parliament

1947 births
Living people
People from Haukipudas
Ministers of Education of Finland
Centre Party (Finland) politicians
Members of the Parliament of Finland (1983–87)
Members of the Parliament of Finland (1987–91)
Members of the Parliament of Finland (1991–95)
Members of the Parliament of Finland (1995–99)
Members of the Parliament of Finland (1999–2003)
Women government ministers of Finland
University of Oulu alumni
21st-century Finnish women politicians